Haely Anne Jardas (born February 14, 1991) is an American actress and beauty pageant titleholder from Fort Myers, Florida, who was crowned Miss District of Columbia 2015. She competed for the Miss America 2016 title in September 2015.

Pageant career
Jardas first began contending for the Miss District of Columbia title by entering the 2010 pageant at age 19. Unlike most state-level title contests, the District of Columbia title does not have preliminary contests at a city or regional level. In 2010, her platform was "Fighting Hunger in Our Country" and her talent was a musical theater-style vocal performance of the song "When You've Got It, Flaunt It" from the musical The Producers. She was not a finalist for the title.

In 2011, she entered on the same platform with another vocal performance. For the 2012 pageant, her platform shifted to "Disability Arts" with her talent once again a vocal performance. Jardas did not enter the 2013 pageant and entered the 2014 contest only to withdraw before the pageant weekend.

In her final attempt due to the pageant's age restrictions, Jardas competed at the 2015 Miss District of Columbia pageant at age 24. Entering the pageant in June 2015 as one of 18 finalists, Jardas's competition talent at Arena Stage was a vocal performance of "Blank Space" by Taylor Swift. This earned her the Janet Alpert Talent Award as the best overall talent performance. Her platform is "Mental Health Matters". Jardas won the competition on Sunday, June 14, 2015, when she received her crown from outgoing Miss District of Columbia titleholder Teresa Davis. As Miss District of Columbia, her activities include public appearances across the national capitol area.

Jardas was District of Columbia's representative at the Miss America 2016 pageant in Atlantic City, New Jersey, in September 2015. In the televised finale on September 13, 2015, she placed outside the Top 15 semi-finalists and was eliminated from competition. She was awarded a $3,000 scholarship prize as her state's representative.

Early life and education
Jardas is a native of Fort Myers, Florida. She is a 2009 graduate of Cypress Lake High School.

Jardas is a 2013 graduate of American University where she earned Bachelor of Arts degrees in theatre performance and broadcast journalism. She joined the District of Columbia Department of Parks and Recreation in November 2014.

References

External links

Haely Jardas official website
Miss District of Columbia official website

Living people
1991 births
American beauty pageant winners
Miss America 2016 delegates
People from Washington, D.C.
American University alumni